Manoor may refer to places in India:

 Manoor, Medak, a village and mandal in Medak district in Telangana
 Manoor, Udupi, a village in Udupi district, Karnataka